Francisco Antonino Vidal (1827–1889) was born in Montevideo, though his birth has also been reported as in 1825, in San Carlos, Uruguay. He was a senator and two-time president of Uruguay.

Background and earlier political roles

He grew to become active in Uruguayan politics, serving as a member of the Colorado party. He was appointed interim minister of the government c. 1865, and later became a member of the Senate of Uruguay. He served as the President of the Senate of Uruguay in 1870 and 1879.

Terms as President of Uruguay

He became President of Uruguay in 1880, but was forced to resign in 1882 by Máximo Santos. He became president once more in 1886, but his term only lasted a few months until Santos took over once again.

Death

He died on February 7, 1889, in Montevideo.

References

Presidents of Uruguay
Presidents of the Senate of Uruguay
1827 births
1889 deaths
Uruguayan people of Catalan descent
Colorado Party (Uruguay) politicians
Defence ministers of Uruguay
19th-century Uruguayan people
People from San Carlos, Uruguay